Japan participated in the 2010 Asian Para Games–First Asian Para Games in Guangzhou, China from 13 to 19 December 2010. Athletes from Japan achieved a total of 103 medals (including 32 gold), and finished second at the medal table, one spot behind the host nation China.

References

Nations at the 2010 Asian Para Games
2010 in Japanese sport
Japan at the Asian Para Games